Erivelton Gomes Viana aka Erivelton (born April 2, 1978) is a Brazilian footballer, born in Carvalhos, Minas Gerais, who plays central back.

Contract
 Ceará.

References

External links
zerozerofootball.com

1978 births
Brazilian footballers
Living people
Ceará Sporting Club players
Association football defenders